UTC+00:20 is an identifier for a time offset from UTC of +00:20.

History

UTC+00:20 was used in the Netherlands from 1 May 1909 to 16 May 1940. It was known as Amsterdam Time or Dutch Time.

The exact time zone was GMT +0h 19m 32.13s until 1 July 1937, when it was simplified to GMT +0h 20m. When Germany occupied the Netherlands in World War II, Berlin Time was adopted, and this has been retained ever since.

The reason for the specific offset of +0h 19m 32.13s was that the time zone was centered on the mean solar time of the Westertoren (4° 53' 01.95" E Longitude), the tower of the Westerkerk church in Amsterdam.

UTC+00:20 was also used as daylight saving time in the British colony Gold Coast between 1919 and 1942.

See also
Time in the Netherlands

References

External links
 Albertus Antonie Nijland, "Time in Holland", The Observatory, 32 (1909), 301.
 

UTC offsets
20th century in the Netherlands
History of science and technology in the Netherlands
Time in the Netherlands